Match! Reverse Drama is a South Korean mini-drama series that first aired on August 8, 2004, as a part of SBS's Good Sunday programme. Each Reverse Drama is usually unrelated to previous dramas, unless it is split into parts, and generally has a large twist in the story at the end. The two mini-dramas compete by votes cast on the main site. Generally, the show invites celebrities to act in a very humorous and sarcastic way not seen in regular dramas. The program later changed its name to Reverse Theatre, which featured a celebrity (TVXQ, Danny Ahn, Jun Jin) bearing the program's name. Despite the changes, the program ended on April 23, 2006, due to low ratings.

List of episodes

References

External links
  Good Sunday Official Homepage

Seoul Broadcasting System television dramas
2004 South Korean television series debuts
2006 South Korean television series endings
Korean-language television shows